Helvíkovice is a municipality and village in Ústí nad Orlicí District in the Pardubice Region of the Czech Republic. It has about 500 inhabitants. It lies on the Divoká Orlice river.

Administrative parts
The hamlet of Houkov is an administrative part of Helvíkovice.

History
Helvíkovice was founded in the second half of the 14th century.

Notable people
Prokop Diviš (1698–1765), inventor, catholic priest

References

External links

Villages in Ústí nad Orlicí District